Where the Sky Begins is a Canadian documentary television series which aired on CBC Television in 1976.

Premise
This 13-part series concerned the history of aviation, an international joint production of Bavaria Films, ORTF, Radio-Canada and Telcia Films. It was originally produced in French, then the English-dubbed version was developed by Cinelume Productions under the direction of Donnalu Wigmore of CBC's Toronto headquarters.

Scheduling
The English version of this half-hour series was broadcast on CBC Television Thursdays at 7:30 p.m. (Eastern time) from 3 June to 16 September 1976. It was rebroadcast on weekday afternoons in October 1978, and in a Sunday time slot in 1979.

References

External links
 

CBC Television original programming
1976 Canadian television series debuts
1979 Canadian television series endings
Documentary television series about aviation